The Christelijk College Nassau-Veluwe (CCNV) is a school in Harderwijk, Netherlands. It was founded in 1922 as a Christelijk Lyceum. The school houses just under 1500 pupils and 150 members of staff. Its rector is Elly Bakker.

History
The school was founded in 1918, but did not open its doors until a year later. During the Second World War, multiple people who were connected to the school were killed. The names of these people are now represented on a plaque in the main stairwell.

Notable alumni 
 Tim Visser. International rugby player, currently playing wing for Harlequin F.C.
 Theo Bos. Dutch cyclist
 Joost Eerdmans. Dutch politician

References

 , Van Latijnse school tot Chr. College, 1979, Harderwijk

Christian schools in the Netherlands
Secondary schools in the Netherlands
Harderwijk